Znamensk is the name of several inhabited localities in Russia.

Urban localities
Znamensk, Astrakhan Oblast, a closed town in Astrakhan Oblast

Rural localities
Znamensk, Kaliningrad Oblast, a settlement in Znamensky Rural Okrug of Gvardeysky District of Kaliningrad Oblast